Keiichi Kimura may refer to:

, Japanese photographer
, Japanese Paralympic swimmer